In motorsport rallying, a crew's due time is simply the time that a team is due at the next time control. If the crew arrive on or before their due time, they will incur no time penalty. In practice, because determining a winner depends on being able to sort finishers in order of accrued penalty points (those with the fewest wins), due times are usually set to be very difficult if not impossible to attain.

Due times can be specified using ordinary time of day, or using special timing schemes such as targa timing.

Example
On a particular rally, cars are started at one-minute intervals. Car 1 starts a section at 02.35 and the section is 12 miles long. Set at an average speed of 30 mph, the section should take exactly 24 minutes. Therefore, their due time is 2.35 + 24, which is 2.59. If they arrive at the time control at 3.01, they will accrue 2 minutes penalty.

References
What Is WRC? Glossary (International Sportsworld Communicators)

Rally racing